Professional communication, encompasses written, oral, visual and digital communication within a workplace context. This discipline blends together pedagogical principles of rhetoric, technology, software, and learning theory to improve and deliver communication in a variety of settings ranging from technical writing to usability and digital media design to more effectively communicate in the business world.

It is a new discipline that focuses on the study of information and the ways it is created, managed, distributed, and consumed. Since communications is a rapidly changing area, technological progress seems to often outpace the number of available expert practitioners. This creates a demand for skilled communicators.

Communication skills are critical to a business because all businesses, to varying degrees, involve the following: writing, reading, editing, speaking, listening, software applications, computer graphics, and Internet research. Job candidates with professional communication backgrounds are more likely to bring to the organization sophisticated perspectives on society, culture, science, and technology.

The field is closely related to that of technical communication, though professional communication encompasses a wider variety of skills.

Professional communication theory

Professional communication draws on theories from fields as different as rhetoric and science, psychology and philosophy, sociology and linguistics.

Much of professional communication theory is a practical blend of traditional communication theory, technical writing, rhetorical theory, adult learning theory, and ethics. Carolyn Miller in What's Practical about Technical Writing? refers to professional communication as not simply workplace activity and to writing that concerns "human conduct in those activities that maintain the life of a community." As Nancy Roundy Blyler discusses in her article Research as Ideology in Professional Communication researchers seek to expand professional communication theory to include concerns with praxis and social responsibility.

Regarding this social aspect, in "Postmodern Practice: Perspectives and Prospects," Richard C. Freed defines professional communication as A. discourse directed to a group, or to an individual operating as a member of the group, with the intent of affecting the group's function, and/or B. discourse directed from a group, or from an individual operating as a member of the group, with the intent of affecting the group's function, where group means an entity intentionally organized and/or run by its members to perform a certain function....Primarily excluded from this definition of group would be families (who would qualify only if, for example, their group affiliation were a family business), school classes (which would qualify only if, for example, they had organized themselves to perform a function outside the classroom--for example, to complain about or praise a teacher to a school administrator), and unorganized aggregates (i.e., masses of people). Primarily excluded from the definition of professional communication would be diary entries (discourse directed toward the writer), personal correspondence (discourse directed to one or more readers apart from their group affiliations), reportage or belletristic discourse (novels, poems, occasional essays--discourse usually written by individuals and directed to multiple readers not organized as a group), most intraclassroom communications (for example, classroom discourse composed by students for teachers) and some technical communications (for example, instructions--for changing a tire, assembling a product, and the like; again, discourse directed toward readers or listeners apart from their group affiliations)....Professional communication...would seem different from discourse involving a single individual apart from a group affiliation communicating with another such person, or a single individual communicating with a large unorganized aggregate of individuals as suggested by the term mass communication (Blyler and Thralls, Professional Communication: The Social Perspective, (pp. 197-198).

Professional communication journals
 IEEE Transactions on Professional Communication
The IEEE Transactions on Professional Communication is a refereed quarterly journal published since 1957 by the Professional Communication Society of the Institute of Electrical and Electronics Engineers (IEEE). The readers represent engineers, technical communicators, scientists, information designers, editors, linguists, translators, managers, business professionals and others from around the globe who work as scholars, educators, and/or practitioners. The readers share a common interest in effective communication in technical workplace and academic contexts.

The journal's research falls into three main categories: (1) the communication practices of technical professionals, such as engineers and scientists, (2) the practices of professional communicators who work in technical or business environments, and (3) research-based methods for teaching professional communication.

The Journal of Professional Communication is housed in the Department of Communication Studies & Multimedia, in the Faculty of Humanities at McMaster University in Hamilton, Ontario.

JPC is an international journal launched to explore the intersections between public relations practice, communication and new media theory, communications management, as well as digital arts and design.

Studying professional communication
The study of professional communication includes:
the study of rhetoric which serves as a theoretical basis
the study of technical writing which serves as a form of professional communication
the study of in-person and virtual training, which serves as a form of communication delivery
the study of visual communication which also uses rhetoric as a theoretical basis for various aspects of creating visuals
the study of various research methods

Other areas of study include global and cross-cultural communication, technical and professional training, marketing and public relations, technical editing, digital literacy, composition theory, video production, corporate communication, and publishing. A professional communication program may cater to a very specialized interest or to several different interests. Professional communication can also be closely tied to organizational communication and corporate training.

Students who pursue graduate degrees in professional communication research communicative practice in organized contexts (including business, academic, scientific, technical, and non-profit settings) to study how communicative practices shape and are shaped by culture, technology, history, and theories of communication.

Professional communication encompasses a broad collection of disciplines, embracing a diversity of rhetorical contexts and situations. Areas of study range from everyday writing at the workplace to historical writing pedagogy, from the implications of new media for communicative practices to the theory and instructional design of online learning, and from oral presentations and training to the website design.

Types of professional documents
Short reports
Proposals
Case studies
Lab reports
Memos
Progress / Interim reports
Writing for electronic delivery
Web-based training modules

See also
 Communication studies
 Cristal Festival Europe
 Technical Communication
 Health communication
 Science communication
 Free Wikiversity Technical Writing Courses

Notes

References
Iowa State University- http://eserver.org/courses/s05/506/

Technical communication
Professionalism